Bheemarao Basawanthrao Patil, popularly known as B B Patil is an Indian politician who is the current Member of Parliament in the Lok Sabha for Zahirabad constituency. he is belonging to TRS Party.

References

Living people
Telangana Rashtra Samithi politicians
India MPs 2014–2019
Lok Sabha members from Telangana
Telangana politicians
People from Telangana
People from Medak district
1955 births
India MPs 2019–present